On August 11, 2000, United States President Bill Clinton signed Executive Order 13166, "Improving Access to Services for Persons with Limited English proficiency".  The Executive Order requires federal agencies to examine the services they provide, identify any need for services to those with limited English proficiency (LEP), and develop and implement a system to provide those services so LEP persons can have meaningful access to them.  It is expected that agency plans will provide for such meaningful access consistent with, and without unduly burdening, the fundamental mission of the agency.  The Executive Order also requires that the Federal agencies work to ensure that recipients of Federal financial assistance provide meaningful access to their LEP applicants and beneficiaries.

To assist Federal agencies in carrying out these responsibilities, the U.S. Department of Justice issued LEP Guidance that set forth the compliance standards that recipients of Federal financial assistance must follow to ensure that their programs and activities normally provided in English are accessible to LEP persons and thus do not discriminate on the basis of national origin in violation of Title VI's prohibition against national origin discrimination.

See also 

 Languages of the United States
 Language politics
 Civil Rights
 Civil Rights Act of 1964
 Cultural competence
 Immigration to the United States
 Multiculturalism
 Interpretation
 Translation

References

External links 
 Executive Order 13166 full text
 Federal Interagency Working Group on Limited English Proficiency

13166
Languages of the United States
Language policy in the United States
Minority rights